Norwegian International School (abbreviated NIS) is located at New GRA, Port Harcourt. It was set up in 1983 to cater to the educational needs of expatriate children from Bulkcem Cement Company. The school first operated with two teachers and approximately twelve students but has since grown with children from other companies attending it. Currently, the school serves nursery through secondary, ages 2 through 16.

Curriculum
The school's curriculum comprises elements of the English National Curriculum, alongside the curricular standards of the Cambridge International Primary Programme (CIPP) and the International General Certificate of Secondary Education (IGCSE).

References

External links
Official website

1983 establishments in Nigeria
1980s establishments in Rivers State
Educational institutions established in 1983
European Nigerian culture in Rivers State
International schools in Rivers State
Schools in Port Harcourt
International high schools
Norwegian international schools
Norwegian diaspora in Africa